A locking differential is a mechanical component, commonly used in vehicles, designed to overcome the chief limitation of a standard open differential by essentially "locking" both wheels on an axle together as if on a common shaft. This forces both wheels to turn in unison, regardless of the traction (or lack thereof) available to either wheel individually.

When the differential is unlocked (open differential), it allows each wheel to rotate at different speeds (such as when negotiating a turn), thus avoiding tire scuffing. An open (or unlocked) differential always provides the same torque (rotational force) to each of the two wheels on that axle. Therefore, although the wheels can rotate at different speeds, they apply the same rotational force, even if one is entirely stationary, and the other spinning (equal torque; unequal rotational speed).

By contrast, a locked differential forces both left and right wheels on the same axle to rotate at the same speed under nearly all circumstances, regardless of the tractional differences at either wheel. Therefore, each wheel can apply as much rotational force as the traction under it will allow, and the torques on each side-shaft will be unequal. (Unequal torque, equal rotational speeds). Exceptions apply to automatic lockers, discussed below.

A locked differential can provide a significant traction advantage over an open differential, but only when the traction under each wheel differs significantly.

All of the above applies to central differentials as well as to those in each axle: full-time four-wheel-drive vehicles have three differentials, one in each axle, and a central one (called a "transfer case") between the front and rear axles.

Applications

 Some utility vehicles such as tow trucks, forklifts, tractors, and heavy equipment use locking differentials to maintain traction, especially when driving on soft, muddy, or uneven surfaces. Lockers are common in agricultural equipment and military trucks. On some farm tractors, there is a pedal that can be stepped on with the operator's heel to lock the differential as needed.
 Differential locking can also be used in the sport of drifting as an alternative to a limited-slip differential.
 Four-wheel drive vehicles that drive off-road often use a locking differential to keep from getting stuck when driving on loose, muddy, or rocky terrain. Locking differentials are considered essential equipment for serious off-road driving. Many such vehicles have a locking differential on the central differential (between the front and rear axles), rear differential and front differential, or any combination of any of the three.  Differential locks are also used on some "non-utility" four-wheel-drive vehicles (such as the Mitsubishi Shogun) to compensate for a relative lack of axle articulation (vertical wheel movement). High amounts of articulation are desirable for off-road driving, to allow the wheels to maintain ground contact over uneven surfaces, but this can lead to excessive body-roll at high speeds on the road, as well as vague steering. Such 4x4s often have suspension systems designed as a compromise between articulation and handling.  If articulation is limited, one wheel on an axle may be lifted off the ground by rough terrain, thus losing all traction to all wheels (all power goes to the lifted wheel, which spins freely).  A rear locking differential is often supplied to make up for this compromiseif a wheel is lifted off the ground, the locking differential can be activated, driving the wheel that remains on the ground.

Types

Automatic lockers
Automatic lockers lock and unlock automatically with no direct input from the driver. Some automatic locking differential designs ensure that engine power is always transmitted to both wheels, regardless of traction conditions, and will "unlock" only when one wheel is required to spin faster than the other during cornering. These would be more correctly termed automatic unlocking differentials, because their at-rest position is locked. They will never allow either wheel to spin slower than the differential carrier or axle as a whole, but will permit a wheel to be over-driven faster than the carrier speed. The most common example of this type would be the Detroit Locker, made by Eaton Corporation, also known as the Detroit No-Spin, which replaces the entire differential carrier assembly. Others, sometimes referred to as lunchbox lockers, use the stock differential carrier and replace only the internal spider gears and shafts with interlocking plates. Both types of automatic lockers will allow for a degree of differential wheel speed while turning corners in conditions of equal traction, but will otherwise lock both axle shafts together when traction conditions demand it.
 Pros: Automatic action, no stopping for engagement or disengagement is necessary when road conditions change.
 Cons: Increased tire wear and noticeable impact on driving behaviour. During cornering, which half-axle is uncoupled is dependent on torque direction applied by the driveline.  When the torque direction is reversed, the speed of the driveline is suddenly forced to change from the inner to the outer axle, accompanied by tire chirping and a strong jerk. During cornering, the automatic locker is characterized by heavy understeer which transitions instantly to power oversteer when traction is exceeded.

Some other automatic lockers operate as an open differential until wheel slip is encountered and then they lock up. These types generally use an internal governor to monitor vehicle speed and wheel slip. An example of this is the Eaton automatic locking differential (ALD), or Eaton automatic differential lock (ADL), developed by the Eaton Corporation and introduced in 1973 for GM's Rounded-Line C/K Series pickups and utilities. The Eaton ADL is sometimes incorrectly called the Gov-Lok, despite neither GM nor Eaton ever calling it by that name. Gov-Lok is rather an unofficial name of unknown origin that gained popularity over the years. Both Eaton and GM do not know where the name came from, and Eaton has made several unsuccessful attempts in the past to debunk the Gov-Lok name. An updated version of the old Eaton ADL design is still available from Eaton, now known as the Eaton mLocker mechanical differential lock.

Some other automatic lockers operate as an open differential until high torque is applied, at which point they lock up. This style generally uses internal gears systems with very high friction. An example of this is the ZF sliding pins and cams type available for use in early Volkswagens.

Selectable lockers MRT

Selectable lockers allow the driver to lock and unlock the differential at will from the driver's seat. This can be accomplished in many ways. 
 Compressed air (pneumatics).  
 Cable-operated mechanism as is employed on the "Ox Locker".
 Electronic solenoids and (electromagnetics) like Eaton's "ELocker". However, OEMs are beginning to offer electronic lockers as well.  Nissan Corporation's electric locker can be found as optional equipment on the Frontier (Navara) and Xterra.  Ford offers an electronic rear locker on the F-series and Ranger trucks.  Toyota currently offers a rear e-locker on the Tacoma and 4Runner (TRD Off-Road and TRD Pro trims only), but has also offered front and rear e-lockers on vehicles such as the Land Cruiser in the past.
 Pros: Allows the differential to perform as an "open" differential for improved drivability and maneuverability, and provides full locking capability when it is desirable or needed.
 Cons: Mechanically complex with more parts to fail.  Some lockers require the vehicle to stop for engagement.  Needs human interaction and forward-thinking regarding upcoming terrain.  Unskilled drivers often put massive stress on driveline components when leaving the differential in locked operation on terrain not requiring a locker.

Spool
A spool is a device that connects the two axles directly to the ring gear. There is no differentiation side to side, so a vehicle equipped with a spool will bark tires in turns and may become unmanageable in wet or snowy weather. Spools are usually reserved for competition vehicles not driven on the street.

Mini-spool uses the stock carrier and replaces only the internal components of the differential, similar in installation to the lunchbox locker. A full spool replaces the entire carrier assembly with a single machined piece. A full spool is perhaps the strongest means of locking an axle, but has no ability to differentiate wheel speeds whatsoever, putting high stress on all affected driveline components.

The internal spider gears of an open differential can also be welded together to make a locked axle; this method is not recommended as the welding process seriously compromises the metallurgical composition of the welded components, and can lead to failure of the unit under stress.

Disadvantages
Because they do not operate as smoothly as standard differentials, automatic locking differentials are often responsible for increased tire wear. Some older automatic locking differentials are known for making a clicking or banging noise when locking and unlocking as the vehicle negotiates turns. This is annoying to many drivers. Automatic locking differentials also affect the ability of a vehicle to steer, particularly if a locker is located in the front axle. Aside from tire scuffing while turning any degree on high friction (low slip) surfaces, locked axles cause understeer and, if used on the front axle, will increase steering forces required to turn the vehicle.  Furthermore, automatically locking differentials can cause a loss of control on ice where an open differential would allow one wheel to spin and the other to hold, while not transferring power.  An example of this would be a vehicle parked sideways on a slippery grade.  When both wheels spin, the vehicle will break traction and slide down the grade.

Alternatives
Limited-slip differentials (LSD) are considered a compromise between a standard differential and a locking differential because they operate more smoothly, and they do direct some extra torque to the wheel with the most traction compared to a standard differential, but are not capable of 100% lockup.

Traction control systems are also used in many modern vehicles, either in addition to, or as a replacement of, locking differentials.  Examples include: Volkswagen's electronic differential lock (EDL), Opel's TC+ installed for the first time in Opel Astra G (2001), et cetera. This is not in fact a differential lock, but operates at each wheel. Sensors monitor wheel speeds, and if one is rotating more than a specified number of revolutions per minute (e.g. 100) than the other (i.e. slipping) the traction control system momentarily brakes it. This transfers more power to the other wheel, but still employs the open differential, which is the same as on cars without the EDL option. If all drive wheels lose traction, then throttle control may be automatically applied. Electronic traction control systems may be integrated with anti-lock braking systems, which have a similar action on braking and use some similar components.  Such systems are used for example on the most recent Nissan Pathfinder, Land Rover Defender, Land Rover Freelander, the McLaren P1 and the McLaren 650s.

References

Automotive transmission technologies